Barry Knight is the name of:

Barry Knight (cricketer) (born 1938), former English cricketer
Barry Knight (referee) (born 1960), English football referee
Barry Knight (politician) (born 1954), American politician
Barry Knight (footballer) (born 1945), Australian rules footballer